Seven Acres Country Park is a country park and Local Nature Reserve in Bolton, Greater Manchester. It lies between the areas of Tonge and Breightmet, and is dissected by Bradshaw Brook. Seven Acres Country Park is more than 300 years old, and is depicted on maps dating back to at least 1764.

History

Today, Seven Acres Country Park encompasses more acreage than the nineteenth century-dubbed-name implies. Former folds such as Ellis Fold, along with its surrounding enclosed fields, are now incorporated into the Country Park making the entire area more than fifteen acres.

Habitat

Seven Acres Country Park is made up of ten kinds of habitat, including heathland, acid grassland, open water and broad-leaved woodland. Seven Acres Country Park is home to many kinds of wildlife. There are over 70 kinds of bird, including kingfisher, dipper, sparrowhawk, kestrel, song thrush, bullfinch, grey heron and blackcap. There are at least 18 kinds of butterfly, including painted lady, red admiral, holly blue, brimstone, speckled wood, small copper and wall brown. There are at least ten types of dragonfly, including broad bodied chaser, banded demoiselle, brown hawker and migrant hawker.

References

Geography of the Metropolitan Borough of Bolton
Local Nature Reserves in Greater Manchester
Tourist attractions in the Metropolitan Borough of Bolton
Country parks in Greater Manchester
Bolton